The Middle Watch is a 1930 British comedy film directed by Norman Walker and starring Owen Nares, Jacqueline Logan, Jack Raine and Dodo Watts. It was based on a play of the same title by Ian Hay. (The play is mentioned by David Niven in his memoir , along withe Ann Todd who had a minor role in it )The film's sets were designed by John Mead.

The film was made by British International Pictures at its Elstree Studios. It was later remade in 1940 by the same company.

Cast
 Owen Nares as Captain Maitland
 Jacqueline Logan as Mary Carlton
 Jack Raine as Commander Baddeley
 Dodo Watts as Fay Eaton
 Frederick Volpe as Admiral Sir Herbert Hewitt
 Henry Wenman as Marine Ogg
 Reginald Purdell as Corporal Duckett
 Margaret Halstan as Lady Agatha Hewitt
 Phyllis Loring as Nancy Hewitt
 Hamilton Keene as Captain Randall
 Muriel Aked as Charlotte Hopkinson
 George Carr as Ah Fong
 Syd Crossley as Sentry

Reception
The film was voted the best British movie of 1931.

References

External links

1930 films
1930 comedy films
British comedy films
Films shot at British International Pictures Studios
1930s English-language films
British films based on plays
Films based on works by Ian Hay
Films directed by Norman Walker
Seafaring films
British black-and-white films
1930s British films